Sneaton is a village and civil parish in the Scarborough district of North Yorkshire, England. There is a church which is dedicated to St Hilda.

According to the 2011 UK census, Sneaton parish had a population of 178, a decrease on the 2001 UK census figure of 190.

Two miles from the village on the outskirts of Whitby is the 19th century  Sneaton Castle.  The castle adjoins St. Hilda's Priory, the Mother Church of the Order of the Holy Paraclete.

References

External links

Villages in North Yorkshire
Civil parishes in North Yorkshire